Tom King (born July 15, 1978) is an American author, comic book writer, and ex-CIA officer. He is best known for writing the novel A Once Crowded Sky, The Vision for Marvel Comics, The Sheriff of Babylon for the DC Comics imprint Vertigo, and Batman and Mister Miracle for DC Comics.

Early life
King primarily grew up in Southern California. His mother worked for the film industry which inspired his love of storytelling. He interned at both DC and Marvel Comics during the late 1990s. He studied both philosophy and history at Columbia University, graduating in 2000. He identifies as "half-Jewish, half-midwestern".

Career
King interned both at DC Comics and Marvel Comics, where he was an assistant to X-Men writer Chris Claremont, before joining the CIA counterterrorism unit after 9/11. King spent seven years as a counterterrorism operations officer for the CIA before quitting to write his debut novel, A Once Crowded Sky, after the birth of his first child.

A Once Crowded Sky, King's debut superhero novel with comics pages illustrated by Tom Fowler, was published on July 10, 2012, by Touchstone, an imprint of Simon & Schuster, to positive reception.

In 2014, King was chosen to co-write Grayson for DC Comics, along with Tim Seeley and Mikel Janin on art. After penning Nightwing No. 30, King, Seeley, and Janin launched Grayson in May 2014, featuring Dick Grayson leaving behind his Nightwing persona at age 22 to become Agent 37, a Spyral spy. King and Seeley plotted the series together and traded issues to script separately, with King providing additional authenticity through his background with the CIA.

A relaunch of classic DC Comics series The Omega Men was published in June 2015 by King and debut artist Barnaby Bagenda, as part of the publisher's relaunch DC You. The series follows a group of rebels fighting an oppressive galactic empire, and feature White Lantern Kyle Rayner. The Omega Men, created in 1981, are DC's cosmic equivalent to Marvel's Guardians of the Galaxy, though significantly more obscure. King's and Bagenda's use of the nine-panel grid, popularized by Alan Moore's and Dave Gibbons' Watchmen, has been praised by reviewers.

In San Diego Comic-Con 2015, Vertigo revealed a new creator-owned project written by King with art by Mitch Gerads titled The Sheriff of Baghdad. The project, a crime series in the vein of Vertigo titles like Preacher and Scalped, was set to launch in late 2015, and was inspired by King's time in Iraq as part of the CIA. Initially an eight-issue miniseries, it was later re-titled The Sheriff of Babylon and expanded into an ongoing series. The first issue launched in December 2015 to critical acclaim, with reviewers praising its "deeply personal" storytelling and the "intriguing" and "captivating" personalities of its characters. That same year, DC announced "Robin War", a crossover storyline set for December that would run for five weeks through titles Grayson, Detective Comics, We Are Robin, and Robin: Son of Batman; King was set to orchestrate the crossover's story-line and pen two one-shots to open and close the series.

As part of Marvel Comics' All-New, All-Different relaunch, King was announced as the writer of The Vision, a new ongoing following the titular character and his newly created family, with artist Gabriel Hernández Walta, colorist Jordie Bellaire, and covers by Mike del Mundo, launching in November 2015. The Vision has been well received by the public, with reviewers calling the series one of Marvel's "biggest surprises" and praising the narration, art, and colors.

In September 2015, DC cancelled King's The Omega Men, along with four other titles, with the series ending with issue seven. After negative fan response to the cancellation, Jim Lee, DC's co-publisher, announced that they would be bringing back The Omega Men through at least issue 12. Lee described the decision to cancel the series as "a bit hasty," crediting the book's critical acclaim and fan social media reactions as the reason the title would go on for the planned 12-issue run.

King penned a Green Lantern one-shot that ties into the "Darkseid War" Justice League storyline, titled "Will You Be My God?", which James Whitbrook of io9 praised as "one of the best" Green Lantern stories.

King and co-writer Tim Seeley announced they would leave Grayson after issue No. 18, with King clarifying on Twitter that they were working on something "big and cool" and needed time. King and Seeley officially left the series in February with issue No. 17, with Jackson Lanzing and Collin Kelly taking over for its last three issues with issue No. 18 in March.

DC Comics announced in February 2016 that King had signed an exclusivity deal with the publisher, which would see him writing exclusively for DC and Vertigo. King revealed via his Twitter account that he would stay on The Vision as writer through issue 12, finishing the story arc he had planned from the beginning.

In March 2016, it was announced that King would be writing the main bi-weekly Batman series beginning with a new No. 1, replacing long-time writer Scott Snyder, as part of DC's Rebirth relaunch that June. King has stated that his run would be 100 issues total, with the entirety being released twice-monthly, though this was later curtailed to 85 issues and 3 annuals, with a 12 issue followup maxiseries Batman/Catwoman to finish the story.

In August 2017, King and regular collaborator Mitch Gerads launched the first issue of their Mister Miracle series, with a planned total run of twelve issues. In June 2018 DC Comics announced King would be writing Heroes in Crisis, a limited series centering around a concept he introduced in Batman.

In July 2018, he received the Eisner Award for Best Writer, shared with Marjorie Liu.

In May and June 2019, King, DC Co-Publisher Jim Lee, and CW series actresses Nafessa Williams, Candice Patton, and Danielle Panabaker toured five U.S. military bases in Kuwait with the United Service Organizations (USO), where they visited the approximately 12,000 U.S. military personnel stationed in that country as part of DC's 80th anniversary of Batman celebration.

In September 2020, DC Comics announced that King would be among the creators of a revived Batman: Black and White anthology series to debut on December 8, 2020. From 2021 to 2022, King was the writer on the eight-issue miniseries Supergirl: Woman of Tomorrow with artist Bilquis Evely. David Harth, for CBR, commented that since Omega Men, "King has mostly stayed away from sci-fi, going for a more psychological take on superheroes instead". Harth highlighted that Supergirl: Woman of Tomorrow "is very much a sci-fi epic" and that the series is "even more imaginative than Omega Men's sci-fi, as it has King flexing his muscles in different ways".

In November 2022, it was announced that King would be writing both Batman: The Brave and the Bold and The Penguin, as a part of Dawn of DC relaunch in 2023.

In January 2023, it was announced by DC Studios co-chairman and co-CEO James Gunn that King was one the architects of the new DC Universe media franchise of feature films and other media that would succeed the DC Extended Universe.

In March 2023, it was announced that King would be writing the new Wonder Woman relaunch as a part of Dawn of DC.

Personal life
As of 2016, King lives in Washington, D.C. with his wife and three children.

Bibliography

Novels
A Once Crowded Sky (with illustrations by Tom Fowler, 336 pages, Touchstone, 2012)

DC Comics
Time Warp: "It's Full of Demons" (with Tom Fowler, anthology one-shot, Vertigo, 2013)
Batman:
Nightwing vol. 2 #30: "Setting Son" (co-written by King and Tim Seeley, art by Javier Garrón, Jorge Lucas and Mikel Janín, 2014) collected in Nightwing: Setting Son (tpb, 200 pages, 2014)
Grayson (co-written by King and Tim Seeley, art by Mikel Janín, Stephen Mooney (#7, 14, Annual No. 1 and the Futures End one-shot) and Álvaro Martínez (Annual #2), 2014–2016) collected as:
 Agents of Spyral (collects #1–4 and the Grayson: Futures End one-shot, hc, 160 pages, 2015, ; tpb, 2016)
 Includes "The Candidate" short story (co-written by King and Tim Seeley, art by Stephen Mooney) from Secret Origins vol. 3 No. 8 (anthology, 2015)
 We All Die at Dawn (collects #5–8 and Annual No. 1, tpb, 160 pages, 2016)
 Nemesis (collects the DC Sneak Peek: Grayson digital one-shot, #9–12 and Annual No. 2, tpb, 160 pages, 2016)
 A Ghost in the Tomb (collects #13–17, tpb, 184 pages, 2016)
Robin War (hc, 256 pages, 2016, ; tpb, 2017) includes:
 "With the Greatest of Ease" (with Rob Haynes, Khary Randolph, Mauricet, Jorge Corona and Andres Guinaldo, in No. 1, 2016)
 "The Daring Young Man" (with Carmine Di Giandomenico, Khary Randolph, Álvaro Martínez, and Scott McDaniel, in No. 2, 2016)
Batman vol. 3 (with Mikel Janín, David Finch, Riley Rossmo (#7–8), Mitch Gerads (#14–15, 23, 62, 75 and 81), Jason Fabok (#21–22), Clay Mann (#24, 27, 30, 36–37 and 78–79), Joëlle Jones (#33–35, 39–40 and 44), Travis Moore (#38 and 61), Tony Daniel (#45–47, 55–57 and 75–77), Lee Weeks (#51–53, 67 and Annual #2), Matt Wagner (#54), Jorge Fornés (#60, 66–67, 70–72, 84 and Annual #4), Amanda Conner (#68), Yanick Paquette (#69) and John Romita, Jr. (#80–81); the Rebirth one-shot is co-written by King and Scott Snyder, 2016–2020) collected as:
 I am Gotham (collects the Batman: Rebirth one-shot and #1–6, tpb, 192 pages, 2017)
 Night of the Monster Men (includes #7–8, hc, 144 pages, 2017, ; tpb, 2017)
 Issues #7–8 are scripted by Steve Orlando from a plot by King and Orlando.
 I am Suicide (collects #9–15, tpb, 168 pages, 2017)
 I am Bane (collects #16–20, 23–24 and Annual No. 1, tpb, 176 pages, 2017)
 Batman/The Flash: The Button (includes #21–22, hc, 104 pages, 2017, ; tpb, 2019)
 Issue No. 22 is scripted by Joshua Williamson from a plot by King and Williamson.
 The War of Jokes and Riddles (collects #25–32, tpb, 200 pages, 2017)
 The Rules of Engagement (collects #33–37 and Annual No. 2, tpb, 160 pages, 2018)
 Bride or Burglar? (collects #38–44, tpb, 168 pages, 2018)
 The Wedding (collects #45–50, tpb, 176 pages, 2018)
 Includes the Joker short story (art by Mikel Janín) from DC Nation (one-shot, 2018)
 Cold Days (collects #51–57, tpb, 176 pages, 2018)
 The Tyrant Wing (collects #58–60, tpb, 152 pages, 2019)
 Includes the "True Strength" short story (art by Mikel Janín) from Batman Secret Files No. 1 (anthology, 2018)
 Knightmares (collects #61–63 and 66–69, tpb, 176 pages, 2019)
 The Fall and the Fallen (collects #70–74, tpb, 144 pages, 2019)
 City of Bane (collects #75–85 and Annual No. 4, tpb, 344 pages, 2020)
Batman/Elmer Fudd Special (with Lee Weeks and Byron Vaughns, 2017) collected in DC Meets Looney Tunes (tpb, 248 pages, 2018)
Detective Comics:
 Batman: 80 Years of the Bat Family (tpb, 400 pages, 2020) includes:
 "Batman's Greatest Case" (with Tony Daniel and Joëlle Jones, co-feature in #1000, 2019)
 Robin: 80th Anniversary 100-Page Super Spectacular: "The Lesson Plan" (co-written by King and Tim Seeley, art by Mikel Janín, anthology one-shot, 2020)
 Catwoman: 80th Anniversary 100-Page Super Spectacular: "Helena" (with Mikel Janín, anthology one-shot, 2020)
 "Legacy" (with Walter Simonson, co-feature in #1027, 2020)
Batman/Catwoman (hc, 272 pages, 2022,  collects:
 Batman/Catwoman #1–12 (with Clay Mann and Liam Sharp (#7–9), DC Black Label, 2021–2022)
 Batman/Catwoman Special (with John Paul Leon, Bernard Chang and Mitch Gerads, DC Black Label, 2022)
Batman: Black and White vol. 3  #2: "The Unjust Judge" (with Mitch Gerads, anthology, 2021) collected in Batman: Black and White (hc, 312 pages, 2021, ; tpb, 2022)
Batman: Killing Time #1–6 (with David Marquez, 2022) collected as Batman: Killing Time (hc, 208 pages, 2022)
Batman: One Bad Day - The Riddler #1 (with Mitch Gerads, 64 pages, August 16, 2022)
Vertigo Quarterly: CMYK #4: "Black Death in America" (with John Paul Leon, anthology, 2015) collected in CMYK (tpb, 296 pages, 2015)
The Omega Men: The End is Here (tpb, 296 pages, 2016, ; hc, 320 pages, 2020) collects:
 DC Sneak Peek: The Omega Men (with Barnaby Bagenda, digital one-shot, 2015)
 The Omega Men vol. 3 #1–12 (with Barnaby Bagenda and Toby Cypress (#4), 2015–2016)
Teen Titans vol. 5 Annual #1: "The Source of Mercy" (co-written by King and Will Pfeifer, art by Alisson Borges and Wes St. Claire, 2015) collected in Teen Titans: Rogue Targets (tpb, 192 pages, 2016)
Justice League: Darkseid War — Green Lantern: "Will You be My God?" (with Evan Shaner, one-shot, 2016) collected in Justice League: Power of the Gods (hc, 200 pages, 2016, ; tpb, 2016)
The Sheriff of Babylon #1–12 (with Mitch Gerads, Vertigo, 2016–2017) collected as The Sheriff of Babylon (hc, 304 pages, 2018, ; tpb, 2021)
Mister Miracle vol. 4 #1–12 (with Mitch Gerads, 2017–2019) collected as Mister Miracle (tpb, 320 pages, 2019, ; hc, 376 pages, 2020)
The Kamandi Challenge #9: "Ain't It a Drag?" (with Kevin Eastman, 2017) collected in The Kamandi Challenge (hc, 360 pages, 2018, ; tpb, 2019)
DC Universe Holiday Special 2017: "Going Down Easy" (with Francesco Francavilla, co-feature, 2017) collected in A Very DC Rebirth Holiday Sequel (tpb, 176 pages, 2018)
Swamp Thing Winter Special: "The Talk of the Saints" (with Jason Fabok, co-feature, 2018)
 Collected in Swamp Thing: Roots of Terror (hc, 168 pages, 2019)
 Collected in Swamp Thing: Tales from the Bayou (tpb, 168 pages, 2020)
Superman:
Action Comics #1000: "Of Tomorrow" (with Clay Mann, co-feature, 2018)
DC 100-Page Comic Giant: Superman #3–10, 12–15: "Up in the Sky" (with Andy Kubert, anthology, 2018–2019)
 Reprinted as a regular-sized 6-issue limited series under the title Superman: Up in the Sky (2019–2020)
 Collected as Superman: Up in the Sky (hc, 176 pages, 2020, ; tpb, 2021)
Supergirl: Woman of Tomorrow #1–8 (with Bilquis Evely, 2021–2022) collected as Supergirl: Woman of Tomorrow (tpb, 224 pages, 2022)
Superman: Red and Blue #6: "The Special" (with Paolo Rivera, anthology, 2021) collected in Superman: Red and Blue (hc, 272 pages, 2021, ; tpb, 2022)
Heroes in Crisis #1–9 (with Clay Mann, Lee Weeks (#3) and Mitch Gerads (#6 and 8), 2018–2019) collected as Heroes in Crisis (hc, 248 pages, 2019, ; tpb, 2020)
Strange Adventures vol. 5 #1–12 (with Evan Shaner and Mitch Gerads, DC Black Label, 2020–2021) collected as Strange Adventures (hc, 376 pages, 2021, ; tpb, 2022)
Rorschach #1–12 (with Jorge Fornés, DC Black Label, 2020–2021) collected as Rorschach (hc, 304 pages, 2021, ; tpb, 2022)
Wonder Woman: 80th Anniversary 100-Page Super Spectacular: "Dated" (with Evan Shaner, anthology one-shot, 2021)
Batman #126: "The Endless Line" (A Tribute to Neal Adams), with Josh Adams (3 pages, July 2022, also included in other comics published by DC that month)
Human Target vol. 4 #1–12 (with Greg Smallwood, DC Black Label, 2022-2023)
Gotham City: Year One #1-6 (with Phil Hester, 2022-2023)

Other publishers
The Vision vol. 2 (with Gabriel Hernández Walta and Michael Walsh (#7), Marvel, 2016) collected as:
Little Worse than a Man (collects #1–6, tpb, 136 pages, 2016)
Little Better than a Beast (collects #7–12, tpb, 136 pages, 2016)
The Complete Collection (collects #1–12, hc, 488 pages, 2018, ; tpb, 288 pages, 2019)
Love is Love: "I'm Tired" (with Mitch Gerads, anthology graphic novel, 144 pages, IDW Publishing, 2016)
Love Everlasting with Elsa Charretier (2022-Present)

References

External links

 Tom King at the Comic Book DB

1978 births
American comics writers
Living people
Columbia College (New York) alumni
Writers from Washington, D.C.
Marvel Comics writers
Marvel Comics people
DC Comics people
People of the Central Intelligence Agency
21st-century American novelists
Place of birth missing (living people)
Eisner Award winners for Best Writer